NRP Vasco da Gama is a Portuguese frigate of the  operated by the Portuguese Navy. She was laid down by Blohm + Voss on 2 February 1989, launched on 26 June 1989, and commissioned on 18 January 1991.

Service history

In 1995, Vasco de Gama spent five months deployed in the Adriatic Sea as part of Operation Sharp Guard, enforcing economic sanctions and an arms embargo against the former Yugoslavia, with the frigate inspecting 91 merchant ships during the deployment. In July 1998, she was deployed off Guinea-Bissau to rescue Portuguese and other European citizens threatened by the Guinea-Bissau Civil War. Vasco da Gama was deployed to East Timor as part of the Australian-led INTERFET peacekeeping taskforce from 16 November 1999 to 22 February 2000.

References

External links

(Portuguese) NRP Vasco da Gama Portuguese Navy website

Vasco da Gama-class frigates
1989 ships
Ships built in Hamburg